is a city in the eastern part of Aichi Prefecture, Japan. , the city had an estimated population of 183,930 in 72,949 households, and a population density of 1,141 persons per km2. Toyokawa, famous for its Toyokawa Inari temple, is blessed with a good balance of industry, commerce, agriculture and forestry, and is situated in an area rich in history, traditions, and culture.

Geography
Toyokawa is located in an area of rolling hills in southeastern Aichi Prefecture. It has a short coastline with Mikawa Bay.

Climate
The city has a climate characterized by hot and humid summers, and relatively mild winters (Köppen climate classification Cfa).  The average annual temperature in Toyokawa is 15.8 °C. The average annual rainfall is 1751 mm with September as the wettest month. The temperatures are highest on average in August, at around 27.5 °C, and lowest in January, at around 4.8 °C.

Demographics
Per Japanese census data, the population of Toyokawa has been increasing over the past 60 years.

Surrounding municipalities
Aichi Prefecture
Toyohashi
Okazaki
Shinshiro
Gamagōri

History

Origins
The area of modern Toyokawa was settled in prehistoric times. During the Nara period, the kokubunji of Mikawa Province was established in 741.

Middle Ages

Muromachi Period
The temple of Toyokawa Inari, a popular pilgrimage destination, dates from 1441.

Sengoku Period
A number of daimyō clans under the Tokugawa shogunate originate in what are now parts of Toyokawa, most notably the Makino clan.

Early modern period

Edo Period
The area prospered during the Edo period with two post towns along the Tōkaidō, Goyu-shuku and Akasaka.

Late modern period

Meiji Period
After the Meiji Restoration, on October 1, 1889, several villages were organized with the establishment of the modern municipalities system within Hoi District, Aichi Prefecture, including Toyokawa Village. 
On March 13, 1893, Toyokawa was promoted to town status.

Showa Period
Toyokawa City was founded on June 1, 1943, by the merger of Toyokawa town with neighboring Ushikubo Town and Yawata Village, all from Hoi District.

In 1939 the massive Toyokawa Naval Arsenal was established, one of the largest producers of machine guns, aviation ordnance and ammunition in the Empire of Japan.  
It was also had sections that produced military-issue katana, bayonets, and glass lenses for use in cameras, binoculars, and similar equipment. 
During World War II, many thousands of civilians were conscripted or volunteered to work at the Arsenal, and towards the end of the war, this workforce included hundreds of middle school students and high school girls. 
On August 7, 1945, the Toyokawa Naval Arsenal was targeted by a flight of B-29 bombers.  
About 2,500 people were killed during the Toyokawa Air Raid.

Toyokawa was one of the last places to be targeted using conventional explosive and incendiary bombs in the closing days of World War II, occurring the day after Hiroshima was destroyed by an atomic bomb.

Contemporary history

After WWII
After the war, on April 12, 1955, Toyokawa annexed Mikami village from Yana District. This was followed by the neighboring town of Goyu from Hoi District on April 1, 1959. Toyokawa further expanded on February 1, 2006, by annexing Ichinomiya, On January 15, 2008, the towns of Otowa and Mito became part of Toyokawa, and finally on February 1, 2010, the town of Kozakai likewise was merged into Toyokawa City.

Government

Toyokawa has a mayor-council form of government with a directly elected mayor and a unicameral city legislature of 30 members. The city contributes one member to the Aichi Prefectural Assembly.  In terms of national politics, the city is part of Aichi District 8 of the lower house of the Diet of Japan.

Military facilities
JGSDF Camp Toyokawa

External relations

Twin towns/sister cities

International
Sister cities
Cupertino, California（California, United States of America）
since, 1978
Friendship city
Xinwu District（Wuxi, Jiangsu, China）
since April 15, 2009

Education
Toyokawa has 26 public elementary schools and 10 public junior high schools operated by the city government, and five public high schools operated by the Aichi Prefectural Board of Education. There is also one private high school. The prefecture also operates one special education school for the handicapped.

Transportation

Railways

Conventional lines
 Central Japan Railway Company
Tōkaidō Main Line：-  –  –
Iida Line：-  –  –  –  –  –  –  –
 Meitetsu
Nagoya Main Line：-  –  –  –  –  –  –
Toyokawa Line：-  –  –  –  –

Roads

Expressways
 Tōmei Expressway

Japan National Route

Seaways

Seaport
Port of Mito（Port of Mikawa）

Local attractions

Castles
Ina Castle
Makino Castle
Ushikubo Castle
Temples
Toyokawa Inari – noted Buddhist temple
Mikawa Kokubun-ji
Shrines
Toga Shrine – ichinomiya of Mikawa Province

Notable people from Toyokawa

Atsuya Ota, Basketball player
Yuka Kato, Olympic swimmer
Gakuto Kondo, professional soccer player
Masahiko Morifuku, Baseball player
Sion Sono, movie director
Yukinari Sugawara, professional soccer player
Yamamoto Kansuke, Japanese Samurai of the Sengoku period
Yusuke Yamamoto, Japanese Actor

References

External links
  
 

 
Cities in Aichi Prefecture
Populated coastal places in Japan